Muhammad Azam Khan (1908–1994) was a senior general of the Pakistan army who was a minister under Field Marshal Ayub Khan, the first military ruler of Pakistan. Azam was the first commander of the Pakistan Army's I Corps, and was Governor of East Pakistan.

Early life and education 
Khan was born on 1 August 1908 in Mathra, Peshawar, Khyber Pakhtunkhwa province, British India into the family of Khan Bahadur Akram Khan, a soldier who had served in the British army and fought against the germans in France in world war one. He attended the Rashtriya Indian Military College then the Royal Military College, Sandhurst and was commissioned a second lieutenant on the Unattached List for the Indian Army on 29 August 1929.

Military career 
Khan started his career being attached to the Rifle Brigade for a year then he joined the British Indian Army 1 November 1930 and was posted to the 4th battalion, 19th Hyderabad Regiment. He was promoted Captain 1 August 1938 and appointed Adjutant 6 December 1939. By October 1942 he was serving with 6th battalion, 19th Hyderabad Regiment and had attended a war time staff course. By April 1944 he was a war substantive Major attached to the 10th Baluch Regiment. He was appointed temporary Lt-Col and was the commanding officer of 9th battalion 10th Baluch Regiment from May 1945 to April 1946. He was promoted Major 29 August 1946.

He fought in Arakan, Burma in World War Two. By 1947, he was an Assistant Quarter Master General. On partition and the creation of Pakistan he opted for the Pakistan Army.

On 1 January 1948, he was appointed Brigadier and commander of the 25th Brigade. In January 1950, he was promoted to major general and command of 10th Division at Lahore Four years later he was promoted to lieutenant general.

As the General officer commanding (GOC) of Lahore Garrison he was appointed Martial law administrator in 1953 following cabinet's decision to declare martial law and request military aid to civil power following the provincial authorities loss of control as a result of the anti-Ahmadiyya'Punjab Disturbances'. As the GOC he oversaw the defense of the walled old city during the Lahore riots of 1953. Hailed as the 'Saviour of Lahore' he adopted very broad powers, and it is believed that the experience whetted both his conviction, and the Army's more generally, that they were better candidates to  oversee administration than civilian politicians.

He later served as the 14th Division commander in East Pakistan before joining Ayub Khan's military regime. In 1958, he took command of Pakistan Army's first filed corps, the 1 Corps, then based in Abbottabad and was subsequently promoted to lieutenant general.

Political career
He supported Ayub Khan's coup d'état in 1958 first against the elected civilian government, and then against President Iskander Mirza, an army officer. On 28 October 1958 he was made a senior Minister for Refugees Rehabilitation in Ayub Khan's administration.

He was appointed as the Governor of East Pakistan province on 14 April 1960. He was a well-liked governor in East Pakistan. "Azam Khan acquired the love and respect of the people of East Pakistan by his personal behaviour and free mixing with all classes of people." There were reported rumors back then that president Ayub Khan was upset by the great popularity of the governor and felt threatened by it. Ayub Khan saw him as his potential rival of the future. He established the Graphic Arts Institute in Dacca in 1957.
He remained in office until 1962. During the presidential election of 1964. Azam Khan "supported the presidential candidacy of Fatima Jinnah" and continued to work strongly against Ayub Khan until after the latter's ouster.

President of Pakistan Olympic Association
 Lieutenant General Azam Khan served as the President, Pakistan Olympic Association from 16 November 1958 to 22 September 1963.

Death 
He died in Lahore, Pakistan in 1994.

References

1908 births
1994 deaths
Pakistani generals
Governors of East Pakistan
Pakistani sports executives and administrators
British Indian Army officers
Graduates of the Royal Military College, Sandhurst
Rashtriya Indian Military College alumni